The Chau Chak Wing Museum is a museum at the University of Sydney, Australia.

It was formed by the amalgamation of the Nicholson Museum, the Macleay Museum, and the university art collection, with the building funded by businessman Chau Chak Wing.

In 2021, the museum won the Museums and Galleries National Award (MAGNA) and two Museums Australasia Multimedia and Publication Design Awards (MAPDA).

References 

Museums in Sydney